Alexander Markowich Ostrowski (25 September 1893, in Kiev, Russian Empire – 20 November 1986, in Montagnola, Lugano, Switzerland) was a mathematician.

His father Mark having been a merchant, Alexander Ostrowski attended the Kiev College of Commerce, not a high school, and thus had an insufficient qualification to be admitted to university. However, his talent did not remain undetected: Ostrowski's mentor,  Dmitry Grave, wrote to Landau and Hensel for help.

Subsequently, Ostrowski began to study mathematics at Marburg University under Hensel's supervision in 1912. During World War I he was interned, but thanks to the intervention of Hensel, the restrictions on his movements were eased somewhat, and he was allowed to use the university library.

After the war ended Ostrowski moved to Göttingen where he wrote his doctoral dissertation and was influenced by Hilbert, Klein and Landau. In 1920, after having obtained his doctorate, Ostrowski moved to Hamburg where he worked as Hecke's assistant and finished his habilitation in 1922. In 1923 he returned to Göttingen, and in 1928 became Professor of Mathematics at Basel, until retirement in 1958. In 1950 Ostrowski obtained Swiss citizenship. After retirement he still published scientific papers until his late eighties.

Selected publications
 Vorlesungen über Differential- und Integralrechnung, 3 vols., Birkhäuser; vol. 1, 1945; vol. 1, 2nd edition, 1960; vol. 2, 1951; vol. 3, 1954;
 Solution of equations and systems of equations. Academic Press, New York 1960; 2nd edition 1965; 2016 pbk reprint of 2nd edition 
 Aufgabensammlung zur Infinitesimalrechnung. several vols., Birkhäuser, Basel (1st edition 1964; 2nd edition 1972) pbk reprint vol. 1; vol. 2 A; vol. 2 B; vol. 3
 Collected mathematical papers. 6 vols., Birkhäuser, Basel 1983–1984. vol. 1; vol. 2; vol. 3; vol. 4; vol. 5; vol. 6

See also
Ostrowski's theorem
Ostrowski–Hadamard gap theorem
Ostrowski numeration
Ostrowski Prize

References

External links

Ostrowski Foundation website: short biography

Gautschi, Walter, Alexander M. Ostrowski (1893-1986): His life, work, and students

Functional analysts
Operator theorists
Mathematical analysts
Numerical analysts
Algebraists
20th-century Ukrainian mathematicians
Jewish scientists
1893 births
1986 deaths
Scientists from Kyiv
Ukrainian Jews
Emigrants from the Russian Empire to Switzerland